Johann Berthold von Höffer (born in Ljubljana on 24 July 1667 - died 1718) was a nobleman from Ljubljana, and an amateur Slovenian composer. He founded The Academia Philharmonicorum, Ljubljana in 1701, and primarily composed Latin oratorios. His artistic name in the Academia was Operose Devius.

See also
 Ljubljana Academy of Music

References

1667 births
1718 deaths
Slovenian composers
Male composers
Musicians from Ljubljana
Slovenian male musicians